San Prisco is a comune (municipality) in the Province of Caserta in the Italian region Campania, located about  north of Naples and about  northwest of Caserta.

San Prisco borders the following municipalities: Capua, Casagiove, Casapulla, Caserta, Curti, Santa Maria Capua Vetere.

References

External links
 Official website 

Cities and towns in Campania